Abdul Hakim Ishaqzai, also known as Abdul Hakim Haqqani and Abdul Hakim Sharie (also spelt Sharai or Sharia), is an Afghan Islamic scholar, writer and the current Chief Justice of the Supreme Court of the Islamic Emirate of Afghanistan since 2021 and Minister of Justice. He has also served as chief justice of the Supreme Court in the 1996–2001 Islamic Emirate of Afghanistan. He was the chairman of the negotiation team in the Qatar office. He is one of the founding members of the Taliban and was a close associate of the late leader Mullah Mohammed Omar.

Early life
He was born to Mawlawi Khudaidad in 1967 in the Panjwayi District of Kandahar Province, Afghanistan. He graduated from Darul Uloom Haqqania, a Deobandi Islamic seminary (darul uloom), in Pakistan, and taught there.

Career

Teaching
Apart from teaching at the Darul Uloom Haqqania, until recently he also ran his own Islamic seminary or madrasa in the Ishaqabad area of Quetta, in Pakistan’s Balochistan province.

Judiciary
During the rule of the first Islamic Emirate, in addition to teaching, he also served in the Appellate Court and at the Central Dar ul-Ifta. Following the appointment of Hibatullah Akhundzada as Supreme Leader, Ishaqzai was appointed Chief Justice.

Diplomacy
In September 2020, he was appointed the Taliban's chief negotiator for peace talks in Qatar with the government of Afghanistan, replacing Sher Mohammad Abbas Stanikzai, who became his deputy in the 21-member negotiating team.

Books
Specializing in Islamic jurisprudence, especially its justice system, he has books on various subjects which have been translated into many languages, including Bengali.

References

Living people
1967 births
Taliban leaders
People from Kandahar Province
Taliban founders
Sharia judges
Afghan judges
Darul Uloom Haqqania alumni
Academic staff of Darul Uloom Haqqania
Supreme Court Justices of Afghanistan